Peter Gelderloos (born ) is an American anarchist activist and writer.

Biography 
In November 2001, Gelderloos was arrested with 30 others for trespass in protest of the American military training facility School of the Americas, which trains Latin American military and police. He represented himself in court and was sentenced to six months in prison. Gelderloos previously organized a student rally against the Iraq War and was a member of a copwatch program in Harrisonburg.

In April 2007, Gelderloos was arrested in Spain and charged with disorderly conduct and illegal demonstration during a squatters' protest. He faced up to six years in prison. He claimed that he was unfairly targeted for his political beliefs. He was acquitted in 2009.

He is known among anarchists for his 2005 book, How Nonviolence Protects the State.

Works

See also 
 Anarchism and violence

References

External links 

 2021 archive of official website
 Interview with Last Hours Zine

American anarchists
American essayists
American male essayists
People from Harrisonburg, Virginia
Living people
Year of birth missing (living people)